Australian Christian College – Hume is an independent non-denominational Christian co-educational early learning and primary and  secondary, located in Benalla, Victoria, Australia. The school caters for students ranging from early learning to Year 8.

The Australian Christian College - Hume is one of 12 Australian Christian Colleges located in Australia.

Overview
The school's vision is "to develop students who are equipped spiritually, academically, socially and physically to be a positive influence on the world".

The principal is Sam Woods. In 2023, the School has moved to the site previously occupied by GO TAFE to accommodate the growth in student numbers.

Enrolment is open to Christian students of all denominations as well as non-Christian students.

See also

List of schools in Victoria

References

External links
Official school website

Private primary schools in Victoria (Australia)
Hume
Educational institutions established in 2012
2012 establishments in Australia
Nondenominational Christian schools in Victoria (Australia)